Ear Mountain is an  mountain summit located in Teton County of the U.S. state of Montana.

Description

Ear Mountain is located in the Rocky Mountain Front, which is a subset of the Rocky Mountains. It is situated 23 miles west of Choteau, along the common border shared by Bureau of Land Management and Lewis and Clark National Forest. The Ear Mountain Wildlife Management Area is located nearby, to the east of the mountain. Precipitation runoff from the mountain drains into tributaries of the Teton River.

Climate

Based on the Köppen climate classification, Ear Mountain is located in a subarctic climate zone characterized by long, usually very cold winters, and mild to warm summers. Winter temperatures can drop below −10 °F with wind chill factors below −30 °F.

See also
 Geology of the Rocky Mountains

Gallery

References

External links
 Weather: Ear Mountain
 Ear Mountain: BLM

Mountains of Montana
North American 2000 m summits
Lewis and Clark National Forest